The Xiluo Theater is a former theater in Xiluo Township, Yunlin County, Taiwan.

History
The theater building was originally built in 1940 under the name Xiluo Opera House with the funds from the prestigious Lin Guang-he clan. It was then later renamed as Xiluo Old Theater. The theater building was closed in the 1980s. In 2001, the theater was declared a historical building.

Architecture
The appearance of the theater is Baroque architecture in design. The front gable with symmetric arcs is decorated with stucco molding and added with embellishment patterns and tile mosaic. The interior is mostly of Chinese cypress structure. The theater has a grand stage with more than a thousand seating capacity. The theater is a two-story building with seating capacity of 500 people.

See also
 Cinema of Taiwan

References

1940 establishments in Taiwan
Baroque architecture in Taiwan
Buildings and structures in Yunlin County
Theatres completed in 1940
Theatres in Taiwan